The Creamers are an American punk rock band from Los Angeles, California, United States. Formed in 1986, their melodic and energetic approach to music has been compared to the New York Dolls and Ramones. Over their 35-year career The Creamers have released three albums and countless singles, EPs and compilations. A career spanning CD/DVD anthology comprising unreleased songs, live footage, a documentary and new material is planned for a 2013 release by Negative Reaction Records.  The band continues to record and make occasional live appearances.

Discography 
Studio albums
Love, Honor, & Obey (1989, Sympathy for the Record Industry)
Stick It in Your Ear (1991, Triple X)
Hurry Up & Wait (1993, Triple X)

EPs
The Creamers (1990, Dog Meat)
Two Olives (And a Bottle of Gin)  (1996, No Tomorrow)
Anything We Damn Well Please (1994, Triple X)
All Girl Kung Fu Army (1996, Goofball Music)

Singles
"Broken Record" (1988, Goofball Music)
"Sunday Head" (1990, Fierce Recordings)
"Bob Kringle" (1990, Sympathy for the Record Industry)
"Dead Weight" (1991, Triple X)
"He Needed Killin'" (1996, 1 + 2)
"Two Olives & A Bottle of Gin" (1996, No Tomorrow)

Compilations
Happy Birthday Baby Jesus (Sympathy For The Record Industry)
Gabba Gabba Hey A Tribute To The Ramones (1991, Triple X)
The Big One (1991, Flipside)

Anthologies
This Stuff'll Kill Ya (1995, Triple X)
Cat's Meow (2013, Negative Reaction)

References

External links
 Creamers on Myspace

Hardcore punk groups from California
Musical groups established in 1986
Musical groups disestablished in 1996
Musical groups from Los Angeles
Sympathy for the Record Industry artists
Triple X Records artists
1986 establishments in California